Living It Up was a black-and-white British sitcom starring Arthur Askey and Richard Murdoch that ran for nine episodes from 1957 to 1958. It was written by Sid Colin and Talbot Rothwell. It was made for the ITV network by Associated-Rediffusion. All nine episodes survive in the archives.

Cast
Arthur Askey - Himself
Richard Murdoch - Stinker
Anthea Askey - Herself
Danny Ross - Props Boy
Billy Percy - Postman & Milkman
Hugh Morton

Plot
Living It Up was a TV version of the BBC radio comedy Band Waggon, and a film had also been made starring impresario Jack Hylton. In Living It Up Arthur Askey and Stinker were living in a flat on top of the A-R's Television House in Aldwych. Askey's daughter appeared as herself, as she had done in Love and Kisses in 1955. The characters would often speak directly to the studio audience, and Leila Williams, who would later become Blue Peter's first female presenter, made a guest appearance, as did Valentine Dyall.

Episodes

Series One (1957)
Episode One (12 April 1957)
Episode Two (26 April 1957)
Episode Three (10 May 1957)

Series Two (1958)
Episode One (27 October 1958)
Episode Two (3 November 1958)
Episode Three (10 November 1958)
Episode Four (17 November 1958)
Episode Five (24 November 1958)
Episode Six (1 December 1958)

References
Mark Lewisohn, "Radio Times Guide to TV Comedy", BBC Worldwide Ltd, 2003
BBC Comedy Guide for Living It Up

External links

1950s British sitcoms
1957 British television series debuts
1958 British television series endings
ITV sitcoms